Mohammed Yaqub Ali (Urdu) (March 1912 – 5 August 1994) was a Pakistani judge who was Chief Justice of Pakistan from 1975 to 1977.

Early life and education
Muhammad Yaqub Ali was born at Jalandhar in March 1912, received early education at Jalandhar. He did his graduation from Islamia College (Lahore) and Law from University of Punjab in 1936. He remained active in the Pakistan Movement and was Chairman of the Julundar Chapter of the All India Muslim League.

Career
In 1948, he started practicing at Lahore High Court. He was promoted to the High Court Bench in 1955 and in 1965 was elevated to the Supreme Court Bench. Justice Yaqub Ali was appointed the Chairman of the Karachi Airport Enquiry Commission in 1969 and in 1971 the Chairman of Special Court for Ganga Hijacking Case. In 1975, he led the Pakistan Delegation to the 7th World Peace Conference held at Washington, DC.

Justice Mohammed Yaqub assumed the office of Chief Justice of Pakistan on 1 November 1975. In 1976, he led the Pakistani Delegation to the United Nations third Law of Sea Conference held at New York City. In 1976 prime minister Zulfikar Bhutto passed a constitutional amendment, the Sixth Amendment, which permitted Yaqub to stay as chief justice beyond his superannuation age. 
In 1977, he was appointed as the Chairman of Indus Water Commission. He was a great believer in democracy which is why he was forced to retire by the military dictator Muhammad Zia-ul-Haq on 22 July 1977. 

Justice Yaqub Ali had held a previous martial law by a usurping general violating the constitution of Pakistan as martial law undermines the concept of the rule of law which is the basis for the country's constitution. The usurping General Zia realized his illegal actions would be overturned in a court of law headed by a Judge who believed in democracy so he proposed amendments to force the Chief Justice of the Supreme Court Muhammad Yaqub Ali to retire.

After retirement Justice Yaqub Ali became a social worker in the field of education to make sure he continued to serve his country.

See also
Chief Justices of Pakistan
Supreme Court of Pakistan
List of Pakistanis

References

1912 births
Chief justices of Pakistan
1994 deaths
Pakistani judges
People from Jalandhar
Government Islamia College alumni